José Nicolás de Escalera (1734 – 1804) was a Cuban painter specializing in religious scenes and portraits. He is often described as "Cuba's first painter", having been the earliest native-born artist to create a large, surviving body of professional work.

Life and work
De Escalera was born in San Cristobal de la Habana to an Andalusian father and a Creole mother on September 8, 1734. Little is known about his artistic education; he appears to have been self-trained, and his work bears some resemblance to that of the eighteenth-century Andalusian school, especially paintings by Bartolomé Esteban Murillo. Most of his work was religious in nature. He is particularly known for the oils that adorn the cupola of the Church of Santa María del Rosario, erected by the Counts of Bayona from 1760 - 1766. He also executed works at the Convent of San Francisco in Havana (Regina Angelorum) and the Church of Our Lady of Candelaria in Guanabacoa (San José with the sleeping child and The Coronation of the Virgin by the Holy Trinity).

De Escalera occasionally did portraits, such as his painting of Luis Vicente de Velasco, a Spanish naval officer present at the Siege of Havana. This was offered to King Charles III in 1763, and remains in the collection of the Naval Museum of Madrid.

De Escalera worked mainly in oils. He was the first Cuban-born artist known to have left a sizable body of work; he is also the first Cuban fine artist to have depicted slaves, as seen in his work Santo Domingo preaches to the Bayonne and Chacón family at the Church of Santa Maria del Rosario. He likely saw himself as a devout craftsman simply executing commissions for patrons in a popular baroque style, and was not especially concerned with originality; however, some of his works, such as Virgen (1801), show glimmers of the bold, colorful naturalism which would one day come to define Cuban art.

There are about fifty known examples of his work in collections in Cuba, Spain, and the United States, including many which can be seen at the Museo Nacional de Bellas Artes de La Habana, and the College of San Geronimo's Jose Nicolas de Escalera Art Gallery in Havana.  A handful remain in the churches and institutions where they were originally painted.

De Escalera died in Havana on July 3, 1804.

References

Veerle Poupeye. Caribbean Art.  London; Thames and Hudson; 1998.

External links

1734 births
1804 deaths
Cuban painters